Hasdai (Abu Yusuf ben Yitzhak ben Ezra) ibn Shaprut (Abu Yussuf ibn Shaprut) born about 915 at Jaén, Spain; died about 970 at Córdoba, Andalusia, was a Jewish scholar, physician, diplomat, and patron of science.

His father, Isaac ben Ezra, was a wealthy and learned Jew of Jaén. Hasdai acquired in his youth a thorough knowledge of Hebrew, Arabic, and Latin, the last-named language being at that time known only to the higher clergy of Spain. He also studied medicine, and is said to have discovered a panacea, called Al-Faruk. Appointed physician to Caliph Abd-ar-Rahman III (912-961), he, by his engaging manners, knowledge, character, and extraordinary ability, gained his master's confidence to such a degree that he became the caliph's confidant and faithful counselor. Without bearing the title of vizier he was in reality minister of foreign affairs; he had also control of the customs and ship-dues in the port of Córdoba. Hasdai arranged the alliances formed by the caliph with foreign powers, and he received the envoys sent by the latter to Córdoba. In 949 an embassy was sent by Constantine VII to form a diplomatic league between the hard-pressed Byzantine empire and the powerful ruler of Spain. Among the presents brought by the embassy was a magnificent codex of Pedanius Dioscorides' work on botany, which the Arabic physicians and naturalists valued highly. Hasdai, with the aid of a learned Greek monk named Nicholas, translated it into Arabic, making it thereby the common property of the Arabs and of medieval Europe.

As minister
Hasdai rendered important services to the caliph by his treatment of an embassy headed by John of Gorze, sent to Córdoba in 956 by Otto I. The caliph, fearing that the letter of the German emperor might contain matter derogatory to Islam, commissioned Hasdai to open the negotiations with the envoys. Hasdai, who soon perceived that the letter could not be delivered to the caliph in its present form, persuaded the envoys to send for another letter which should contain no objectionable matter. John of Gorze said that he had "never seen a man of such subtle intellect as the Jew Hasdeu".

Hasdai secured a great diplomatic triumph during the difficulties which arose between the kingdoms of León and Navarre, when the ambitious Queen Toda of Pamplona sought the aid of Abd ar-Rahman in reinstating her deposed grandson, Sancho I of León. Hasdai was sent to the court of Navarre; and he succeeded after a long struggle in persuading the queen to go to Córdoba with her son and grandson, in order to prostrate herself before the caliph, her old enemy, and implore the aid of his arms (958). The proud Navarrese allowed herself to be convinced by Hasdai – as a Jewish poet of the time expressed himself - "by the charm of his words, the strength of his wisdom, the force of his cunning, and his thousand tricks."

Hasdai retained his high position under 'Abd ar-Rahman's son and successor, al-Hakam II, who even surpassed his father in his love for science.

Jewish activity

Hasdai was very active on behalf of his co-religionists and Jewish science. Allegedly, when he heard that in Central Asia there was a Jewish state with a Jewish ruler, he desired to enter into correspondence with this monarch; and when the report of the existence of the Khazar state was confirmed by two Jews, Mar Saul and Mar Joseph, who had come in the retinue of an embassy from the Croatian king to Córdoba, Hasdai entrusted to them a letter, written in good Hebrew addressed to the Jewish king, in which he gave an account of his position in the Western state, described the geographical situation of Andalusia and its relation to foreign countries, and asked for detailed information in regard to the Khazars, their origin, their political and military organization, etc. (See also the Khazar Correspondence.) Historian Shaul Stampfer has questioned the authenticity of letter said to have been received from the Khazar King, citing numerous linguistic and geographic oddities amid a flourishing of pseudo-historiographic texts and forgeries in medieval Spain.

Hasdai sent a letter to Empress Helena of Byzantium in which he pleaded for religious liberty for the Jews of Byzantium. He pointed to his own warm relations with the Muslim Caliph in Córdoba as well as his benevolent attitude towards the Christians of Spain.

Hasdai sent rich presents to the yeshiva of Sura and that of Pumbedita in Babylonia, and corresponded with Dosa, the son of Saadia Gaon. He was also instrumental in transferring the center of Jewish theological studies from Babylonia to Spain, by appointing Moses ben Hanoch, who had been stranded at Córdoba, director of a school, and thereby detaching Judaism from its dependence on the East, to the great joy of the caliph, as Abraham ibn Daud says (Sefer ha-Kabbalah p. 68). Ibn Abi 'Usaybi`a writes of him: "Hasdai b. Isaac was among the foremost Jewish scholars versed in their law. He opened to his coreligionists in Andalusia the gates of knowledge of the religious law, of chronology, etc. Before his time they had to apply to the Jews of Baghdad on legal questions, and on matters referring to the calendar and the dates of the festivals" (ed. Müller, ii. 50).

Hasdai marks the beginning of the florescence of Andalusian Jewish culture, and the rise of poetry and of the study of Hebrew grammar among the Spanish Jews. Himself a scholar, he encouraged scholarship among his coreligionists by the purchase of Hebrew books, which he imported from the East, and by supporting Jewish scholars whom he gathered about him. Among the latter were Menahem ben Saruq of Tortosa, the protégé of Hasdai's father, and Dunash ben Labrat, both of whom addressed poems to their patron. Dunash, however, prejudiced Hasdai to such a degree against Menahem that Hasdai caused Menahem to be maltreated.

Personal life
There is no record of Shaprut having a wife. The family came from either Byzantium or Armenia (now Turkey or Armenia) that has the surname Chiprut claims descent from Hasdai.
In addition, several families throughout the Jewish Diaspora carry variations of the Hasdai name which came about when moving from one country to another [i.e.: Hazday, Hazdai, Hasday, Hazbay]

See also
al-Andalus
Kuzari
Sephardim
Umayyad Caliphate
Judah Halevi

Notes

References

 The Letter of Rabbi Hasdai ibn Shaprut (deprecated)
The Letter of Rabbi Hasdai ibn Shaprut to the Khazars and King Joseph's Reply

 Gampel, Benjamin R. "Jews, Christians, and Muslims in Medieval Iberia: Convivencia through the Eyes of Sephardic Jews." Convivencia: Jews, Muslims, and Christians in Medieval Spain. Mann, Vivan B. et al. eds. New York; George Braziller, Inc., 1992.
 Roth, Norman. "Ibn Shaprut, Hasdai." Medieval Iberia: An Encyclopedia. Gerli, E. Michael, ed. 1st ed. 2003. Print.

Jewish Encyclopedia bibliography
 Filosseno Luzzatto, Notice sur Abou-Jousouf Hasdai ibn-Shaprout, Paris, 1852;
 Reinhart Dozy, Geschichte der Mauren in Spanien, ii.53;
 Rios, Hist. i.145;
 Geiger, Das Judenthum und Seine Gesch. ii.82;
 Carmoly, Histoire des Médecins Juifs, p. 30 (very inadequate);
 Cassel, in Miscellany of Hebrew Literature, i.73;
 Grätz, Gesch. v.360.

10th-century rabbis in al-Andalus
Khazar diplomacy and documents
Medieval Jewish physicians of Spain
910s births
10th-century deaths
People from Jaén, Spain
Physicians from al-Andalus
Court physicians
Jewish viziers
Diplomats from the medieval Islamic world
Scholars from the Caliphate of Córdoba
Jews from al-Andalus